Faye Leung may refer to:
Faye Leung (dancer) (born 1979) from Hong Kong
Faye Leung (businesswoman) from Canada